Cosgriff is a surname. Notable people with the name include:

Jeff Cosgriff (born 1987), American soccer player
Joe Cosgriff (1913–2008), Australian rules football player
Richard H. Cosgriff (1845–1910), Irish-born American businessman, Civil War veteran
Walter E. Cosgriff (1914–1961), American banker